Georg Stenger is a German philosopher and professor and chair of the department of philosophy at the University of Vienna.
He is known for his works on structural ontology, intercultural philosophy, Heidegger's philosophy and also his contributions to Heidegger Gesamtausgabe. 
Stenger is the president of Society of Intercultural Philosophy.

Works
 Georg Stenger: Interkulturelles Denken - Eine neue Herausforderung für die Philosophie. Ein Diskussionsbericht, in: Philosophisches Jahrbuch 1996, 90-103.323-338
 Georg Stenger: Philosophie der Interkulturalität. Erfahrung und Welten. Eine phänomenologische Studie. Freiburg i. Br. / München: Karl Alber 2006. 
 mit Alfred Denker, Shunsuke Kadowaki, Georg Stenger und Holger Zaborowski: Heidegger und das ostasiatische Denken. (= Heidegger-Jahrbuch. Band 7). Verlag Karl Alber, Freiburg i. Br./ München 2013, .
 M. A. C. Otto: Gesang im Nebel. In: Philosophie der Struktur – "Fahrzeug" der Zukunft? Festschrift für Heinrich Rombach. Hrsg. v. Georg Stenger und Margarete Röhrig. Verlag Karl Alber, Freiburg i. Br. / München 1995. . S. 141-149

See also
Polylog - Zeitschrift für interkulturelles Philosophieren
Intercultural relations
Cross-cultural communication
Taha Abdurrahman

References

External links
Georg Stenger at the University of Vienna
Georg Stenger at the University of Würzburg

21st-century German philosophers
Continental philosophers
Living people
Philosophers of culture
Phenomenologists
Heidegger scholars
Academic staff of the University of Vienna
University of Würzburg alumni
Academic staff of the University of Würzburg
Year of birth missing (living people)